Prince Harald of Denmark (Harald Christian Frederik; 8 October 1876 – 30 March 1949) was a member of the Danish Royal Family. He was the third son and fourth child of Frederick VIII of Denmark and his wife, Lovisa of Sweden, and thus brother to Christian X of Denmark and Haakon VII of Norway.

The prince served in the Royal Danish Army for most of his life, and reached the rank of Lieutenant General.

Early life

Prince Harald was born on 8 October 1876 at his parents' country residence, the Charlottenlund Palace in Gentofte Municipality north of Copenhagen, during the reign of his paternal grandfather, King Christian IX. He was the fourth child and third son of Crown Prince Frederick of Denmark and his wife Louise of Sweden. His father was the eldest son of King Christian IX of Denmark and Louise of Hesse-Kassel, and his mother was the only daughter of King Charles XV of Sweden and Norway and Louise of the Netherlands. He was baptised with the names Harald Christian Frederik, and was known as Prince Harald.

Prince Harald was raised with his siblings in the royal household in Copenhagen, and grew up between his parents' city residence, the Frederick VIII's Palace, an 18th-century palace which forms part of the Amalienborg Palace complex in central Copenhagen, and their country residence, the Charlottenlund Palace, located by the coastline of the Øresund strait north of the city. At the age of 17, Prince Harald entered a military career as was customary for princes at the time. He later served with the Guard Hussar Regiment.

Marriage

At the age of 33, on 28 April 1909 at Glücksburg Castle in Schleswig-Holstein, Prince Harald married his second cousin Princess Helena of Schleswig-Holstein-Sonderburg-Glücksburg, daughter of Frederick Ferdinand, Duke of Schleswig-Holstein-Sonderburg-Glücksburg and Princess Karoline Mathilde of Schleswig-Holstein-Sonderburg-Augustenburg.

After their marriage, Prince Harald and Princess Helena lived at the Jægersborghus country house north of Copenhagen which Prince Harald had purchased in 1907. Here their five children were born between 1910 and 1923.

Later life
Like other members of the Danish royal family, his economic situation was influenced by the failure of Den Danske Landmandsbank in 1923. Until 1935, however, he and his family were able to stay at Jægersborghus but then moved to a villa in the northern part of Copenhagen.

At the age of 50, Prince Harald retired from active service with the rank of Major General. In 1933, however, his brother King Christian X appointed him Lieutenant General.

During World War II, Princess Helena became very unpopular because of her sympathy for the German occupation of Denmark and the Nazi party. Because of this, she was reportedly not on speaking terms with her sons.

After the war, Princess Helena was not brought to trial, being a member of the royal family who did not wish any publicity on the matter, but was exiled from Denmark 30 May 1945 and placed under house arrest at the Glücksburg Castle in Germany. She was allowed to return to Denmark in 1947, when Prince Harald fell gravely ill. She stayed with her spouse until his death two years later.

Prince Harald died on 30 March 1949 in Copenhagen. He was buried at Roskilde Cathedral. Princess Helena survived her husband by 13 years and died on 30 June 1962.

Honours
National decorations
 RE – Knight of the Elephant, 28 July 1894
 DM – Cross of Honour of the Order of the Dannebrog, 28 July 1894
 SK – Grand Cross of the Dannebrog, 8 October 1917
 GbET – Commemorative Medal for the Golden Wedding of King Christian IX and Queen Louise
 MM 8 April 1918 – King Christian IX Centenary Medal

Foreign decorations
 : Grand Cordon of the Royal Order of Leopold
 : Grand Cross of the Legion of Honour
  German Imperial and Royal Family:
 Knight of the Black Eagle
 Grand Cross of the Red Eagle
  Mecklenburg: Grand Cross of the Wendish Crown, with Crown in Ore 
 : Grand Cross of the Order of Duke Peter Friedrich Ludwig, with Golden Crown
  Greek Royal Family: Grand Cross of the Redeemer
 :
 Grand Cross of St. Olav, with Collar, 22 June 1906
 Commemorative Medal for the Coronation of King Haakon VII and Queen Maud
 :
 Knight of the Seraphim, 27 August 1897
 Knight of the Order of Charles XIII, 1927
 : Grand Cordon of the Order of Chula Chom Klao
 : GCVO – Honorary Grand Cross of the Royal Victorian Order, 11 October 1901

Issue
Harald and Helena had five children:

Ancestry

References

Citations

Bibliography

 

1876 births
1949 deaths
Burials at Roskilde Cathedral
House of Glücksburg (Denmark)
Danish princes
Sons of kings
Danish Freemasons
Grand Crosses of the Order of the Dannebrog
Recipients of the Cross of Honour of the Order of the Dannebrog
Grand Croix of the Légion d'honneur
Knights of the Order of Charles XIII
Honorary Knights Grand Cross of the Royal Victorian Order